George Raymond McCague (December 5, 1929 – July 14, 2014) was a Canadian politician in Ontario. He was a Progressive Conservative member in the Legislative Assembly of Ontario from 1975 to 1990, and was a cabinet minister in the governments of Bill Davis and Frank Miller.

Background
McCague was born in Essa Township, north of Alliston, Ontario. He was son of J. J. E. McCague, who owned Glenafton Farms which was one of the best known dairy farms of its time. He was educated at Burns Public School, Alliston High School (both schools since closed)  and the Ontario Agricultural College in Guelph, Ontario. He worked as a sod and potato farmer and executive and owned a real estate company in Alliston.

Politics
McCague was a councillor in Alliston from 1960 to 1961, deputy reeve from 1962 to 1964, reeve from 1965 to 1966, a public school board member from 1967 to 1968 and Mayor from 1969 to 1973.  He was chair of the Board of Governors for Georgian College from 1967 to 1974 and Simcoe County warden in 1966. He also served as chair of the Niagara Escarpment Commission in the early 1970s.

He  defeated  Liberal Bob Beattie by 1,691 votes in the riding of Dufferin—Simcoe. He was elected by greater margins in the elections of 1977, 1981, and 1985.

McCague served as parliamentary assistant to the Treasurer just before the 1977 election, and was brought into Bill Davis's cabinet on September 21, 1977, as Minister of Government Services. On January 21, 1978, he was shifted to the Ministry of the Environment. He was named Chair of the Management Board of Cabinet on August 18, 1978. He retained this position until Davis resigned as Premier in 1985. McCague tried to convince Davis to remain in office for another election, but afterwards endorsed Frank Miller to succeed him as party leader.

When Miller replaced Davis as Premier on February 8, 1985, he appointed McCague as Minister of Transportation and Communications. Soon after this, the Tories were reduced to a tenuous minority government in the 1985 election under Miller's leadership. McCague was retained in his portfolio after the election, but did little of significance before the government was defeated in the house.  He sat in opposition for the remainder of his time in the legislature.

McCague was narrowly re-elected in the 1987 election, defeating Liberal candidate Gary Johnson by only 306 votes in the redistributed constituency of Simcoe West.  He did not seek re-election in 1990. He returned to municipal politics, and served as mayor of Tecumseth from 1992 to 1994.

McCague is considered a mentor to his successor in the legislature, former cabinet minister Jim Wilson. He continued to support the federal Progressive Conservative Party over the Reform Party in the 1990s. After leaving provincial politics, McCague served as the Mayor of the newly amalgamated town of New Tecumseth from 1992 to 1994.

Shortly after Mike Harris returned the Progressive Conservatives to government in 1995, McCague was appointed as a government negotiator in talks with the Ontario Medical Association. He was a founding member, and first Chair, of the Board Governors of Georgian College, in Barrie.

Cabinet positions

References

External links

1929 births
2014 deaths
Members of the Executive Council of Ontario
Ontario Agricultural College alumni
Progressive Conservative Party of Ontario MPPs